HD 49798 is a binary star in the constellation Puppis about 650 parsecs from Earth. It has an apparent magnitude of 8.3, making it one of the brightest known O class subdwarf stars.

HD 49798 was discovered in 1964 to be a rare hydrogen-deficient O class subdwarf, and was the brightest known at the time.  This was identified as a binary star, but the companion could not be detected visually or spectroscopically.
  
The X-ray source RX J0648.0-4418 was discovered close to HD 49798's location in the sky. Only the space telescope XMM-Newton was able to identify the source. It is a white dwarf with about 1.3 solar masses, in orbit about HD 49798 and rotating once every 13 seconds. This is detected from the 13-second X-ray pulse, which results from the stellar wind accreting onto the compact object. It has been proposed that the white dwarf is surrounded by a debris disk. In this model, the material of the disk would be funneled onto the poles of the dwarf via the magnetic field, which would explain the observed X-ray pulses. This system is considered a likely candidate to explode as a type Ia supernova within a few thousand years.

References 

Puppis
O-type subdwarfs
032602
049798
CD-44 02920
White dwarfs
X-ray binaries